The Perry River is a perennial river of the West Gippsland catchment, located in the Gippsland region of the Australian state of Victoria.

Location and features
The river descends  over its  course.

Etymology
In the Aboriginal Brataualung language the name for the river is Goomballa, meaning "climbing".

The river was named in 1840 by Count Paweł Strzelecki after Captain Samuel Perry, deputy Surveyor General of New South Wales.

See also

 Rivers of Victoria

References

External links
 
 

West Gippsland catchment
Rivers of Gippsland (region)